Bruce Vogel (born December 24, 1958) is a Minnesota politician and former member of the Minnesota House of Representatives representing District 13B, which included portions of Kandiyohi County in the west central part of the state, including the cities of Willmar, New London, Spicer, Atwater, Pennock, Kandiyohi, Prinsburg, Lake Lillian, Blomkest and Raymond.

A Republican, he was elected in the 2010 general election, unseating Democrat Al Juhnke, and assumed office on January 4, 2011.  He was defeated in the 2012 general election by Democratic-Farmer-Labor Party member Mary Sawatzky. While in the legislature he served on the Agriculture and Rural Development Policy and Finance, Higher Education Policy and Finance, Judiciary Policy and Finance, and Transportation Policy and Finance committees.
Vogel travelled to the US Capitol 1/6/21 to take part in Presiden Trump's rally to stop the peaceful transition of power.

References

External links

 Rep. Vogel Web Page
 Project Votesmart - Rep. Bruce Vogel Profile
 Bruce Vogel Campaign Web Site

Living people
1958 births
People from Slayton, Minnesota
People from Willmar, Minnesota
Republican Party members of the Minnesota House of Representatives
21st-century American politicians